CFKM-DT, virtual channel 16.1 (UHF digital channel 34), is a Noovo owned-and-operated television station licensed to Trois-Rivières, Quebec, Canada, operating as a de facto semi-satellite of Montreal flagship CFJP-DT. The station is owned by the Bell Media subsidiary of BCE Inc. CFKS-DT's studios are located on Boulevard Saint-Jean/Route 40 in Trois-Rivières, and its transmitter is located on Rue Principale in Notre-Dame-du-Mont-Carmel. On cable, the station is available on Cogeco channel 5.

History
The station went to air on September 7, 1986. It was originally launched by Cogeco as a private affiliate of TQS, which was then owned by Jean Pouliot. It became an O&O of the network in 2001 when Cogeco became the network's primary owner. The station was part of V's proposed takeover by Remstar. Since the rebranding of the TQS network on August 31, 2009, CFKM has dropped all non-network programming and became a de facto semi-satellite of Montreal owned-and-operated station CFJP-TV.

Digital television
CFKM shut down its analog signal on channel 16 in early July 2011 and began broadcasting in digital at the same time. The station was the first in Canada to complete the digital transition.

Through the use of PSIP, digital television receivers display CFKM's virtual channel as 16.1.

References

External links
 

FKM
FKM
Television channels and stations established in 1986
1986 establishments in Quebec